Until Eternity Ends is the first and only EP by the Swedish death metal band Edge of Sanity, released by Black Mark Production in 1994. There are two versions of this EP, one has a blue and yellow cover in a standard box, the other has a red and black cover in a slim-line single box. It features three original songs and a cover of "Invisible Sun" by The Police.

The liner notes bear the following message: “These are four songs that we felt didn't fit the album that we are busy writing right now. But we like the songs and wanted them out somehow. This is not a taster of our upcoming CD! The fourth CD Purgatory Afterglow will take off where Unorthodox left! C-Ya (1994).”

Track listing

Personnel
 Dan Swanö − vocals
 Andreas Axelsson − electric guitar
 Sami Nerberg − electric guitar
 Anders Lindberg − bass guitar
 Benny Larsson − drums, percussion

Edge of Sanity albums
1994 debut EPs